Pseudocalotes kingdonwardi, Kingdonward's bloodsucker, is a species of agamid lizard. It is found in China and Myanmar.

References

Pseudocalotes
Reptiles of China
Reptiles of Myanmar
Reptiles described in 1935
Taxa named by Malcolm Arthur Smith